Erika María Benítez Lizaola is a Mexican astronomer whose research involves blazars and active galactic nuclei. She is a professor in the Faculty of Sciences at the National Autonomous University of Mexico (UNAM) and a researcher in the UNAM Institute of Astronomy.

Education and career
Benítez studied physics as an undergraduate at UNAM, and continued at UNAM for doctoral study in astronomy, completing her Ph.D. in 1997. Her dissertation, Estudios de Variabilidad de Núcleos Activos de Galaxias, reported the discovery of the host galaxy for blazar OJ 287.

She has worked as a researcher at the UNAM Institute of Astronomy since 1997.

Recognition
Benítez is a member of the Mexican Academy of Sciences.

References

External links
Interview with Benítez, Radio UdeG, 14 January 2022

Year of birth missing (living people)
Living people
Mexican astronomers
Women astronomers
National Autonomous University of Mexico alumni
Academic staff of the National Autonomous University of Mexico
Members of the Mexican Academy of Sciences
20th-century astronomers
20th-century Mexican scientists
20th-century Mexican women scientists
21st-century astronomers
21st-century Mexican scientists
21st-century Mexican women scientists